St. George's Cathedral is an Anglican cathedral in Georgetown, Guyana. It is the seat of the Bishop of Guyana.

St. George's was designed by Sir Arthur Blomfield and opened on 24 August 1892. The building was completed in 1899. It is located on Church Street in Georgetown and has been designated a national monument.

History

The history of the Anglican Church in Guyana can be traced as far back as 1781, when the Reverend William Baggs, chaplain to Sir George Rodney, came to Guyana. However, his stay was short-lived and it was not until 1796 that the impact of Anglicanism was felt, when the Reverend Francis MacMahon began holding services in a room on the ground floor of a building that was on the site of the present Parliament Buildings.

The first church dates back to 1810 and was erected on the site that now houses St. George's School. This church soon became too small for its increasing membership. In 1839 the foundation stone for a larger church was laid and the small church was relocated at St. Matthew's Parish, East Bank Demerara.

The second church was completed in 1842 and became the first cathedral, as Bishop (William Piercy Austin) was consecrated and the Diocese of Guiana created on 24 August 1842. However, because of a fault in the structure of the building, it began cracking in several places and soon became unsuitable for habitation. It was subsequently dismantled.

In 1877, a temporary pro-cathedral was erected in the grounds of the deanery at a cost of G$10,000. Arthur Blomfield then produced the first plans for the new cathedral - for a building in stone with a central tower and two western towers; but these were rejected because of the weight and the expense. His subsequent plans for a wooden cathedral were accepted, a design that kept many of the salient features of his first plan, such as the central tower and the Latin cross formation of nave and transepts. It was in the Gothic style of architecture, complete with flying buttresses, but it also had a tropical flavour, ensuring light and air. However, it was to be in timber and the committee emphasised that "woods of the country and no others were to be used", although in fact pitchpine was imported from North America for the ceiling.

The foundation stone for the present St. George's Cathedral, built mainly of Greenheart, was laid on 21 November 1889, and the cathedral was consecrated on 8 November 1894 and dedicated by Bishop Proctor Swaby.

Interior

St. George's Cathedral is characterised mainly by Gothic arches, clustered columns and flying buttresses.

The interior of the church makes for fascinating history. Whether it is an article of furniture, the chalices, the memorial tablets or the Baptism registers - they all tell a story. The story is not only about Guyana's history, but glimpses of its Caribbean neighbours are also revealed. There is a small Gothic shrine of carved oak in the northern aisle that commemorates Bishop Coleridge, first Bishop of Barbados, who was responsible for British Guiana from 1826 to 1842. The brass lectern, near the central altar, was given by the Diocese of Barbados when the present cathedral was opened in 1892. The sedilia was donated by Chinese Christians.

The decorative stained glass windows reflect myriad colours in the sunlight. These windows depict scenes from the Crucifixion and the Ascension, among others. Consisting of two rows of six windows, the east window was donated by the McConnell family. The upper windows depict scenes from the Book of Revelation. The intricate ironwork depicts pictures of birds and flowers. 

A large chandelier, a gift from Queen Victoria, hangs prominently within the cathedral. The wooden Centenary Cross in front of the high altar marks the 100th anniversary of the Province of the West Indies, founded in 1883. The cross was carried around the diocese in 1983, marking the centenary. The pulpit, donated in memory of the Jones family of Plantation Houston dates from 1866.

See also
Tōdai-ji Temple, wooden house of worship in Japan 
Pagoda of Fogong Temple, wooden pagoda in China
 Religion in Guyana
 :Category:Deans of St George's Cathedral, Georgetown
List of tallest wooden buildings

References

External links 

 St. George's Anglican Cathedral
 The Mittelholzer Foundation
 A Short History of St. George's, Georgetown, Guyana

19th-century Anglican church buildings
Anglican cathedrals in South America
Guyana
Arthur Blomfield church buildings
Cathedrals in Guyana
Churches completed in 1894
Buildings and structures in Georgetown, Guyana
National Monuments in Guyana
Wooden buildings and structures in Guyana
Wooden churches